Sir John Leopold Egan  (born 7 November 1939) is a British industrialist, associated with businesses in the automotive, airports, construction and water industries. He was chief executive and chairman of Jaguar Cars from 1980 to 1990 and chairman of Jaguar plc from 1985 to 1990, and then served as chief executive of BAA from 1990 to 1999. He is also notable for chairing the construction industry task force that produced the 1998 Egan Report (Rethinking Construction) and the follow-up report, Accelerating Change, in 2002. During 2004, undertook the Egan Review of Skills for Sustainable Communities for the Blair Government. In 2004, after completing two years as president of the Confederation of British Industry, he was appointed chairman of Severn Trent.

Career
John Egan was born in Rawtenstall, Lancashire, the son of a garage owner. The family moved to Coventry where he went to Bablake School. He studied petroleum engineering at Imperial College London and subsequently from 1962 to 1966 worked for Shell in the Middle East. After further studies, this time at London Business School, he moved to AC Delco in 1968 and then British Leyland where he played a part in boosting the fortunes of its Unipart business.

After a four-year spell as Corporate Parts Director of Massey Ferguson, Egan was appointed chairman of Jaguar Cars in 1980, turning round what had been a struggling business. A carmaker facing closure when he took over was sold ten years later to Ford for £1.6bn, at which time Egan moved to become Chief Executive of BAA.

Egan then assumed a variety of non-executive business roles and served as president of the CBI from 2002 to 2004, when he took on the chairmanship of Midlands water company Severn Trent.

Egan is currently the President of the Jaguar Drivers' Club, the only Jaguar owners club to be officially sanctioned by Sir William Lyons and Jaguar cars.

Roles
His other major roles include:
 non-executive chairman of motor distributor Inchcape plc
 non-executive chairman of Harrison Lovegrove
 non-executive vice chairman Legal & General 
 chairman, Asite Ltd (2001–2004)
 president, Confederation of British Industry (2002–2004)
 chairman Central London Partnership
 chairman, London Tourist Board (September 1993 - December 1997)
 president, London Tourist Board
 deputy chairman of London First
 vice-president, Marketing Council
 member of Council, Institute of Directors
 president Institute of Management
 chancellor, Coventry University (2007-2017)
 president, Jaguar Drivers' Club

Honours
Honours include:
 Honorary Graduate, Doctor of Laws, University of Bath, 1988
Bicentenary Medal of the Royal Society of Arts, 1995
 Honorary doctorate, Brunel University, 1997
 Deputy Lieutenant of the County of Warwickshire
 Knighted in the 1986 Birthday Honours
 Honorary Texas Citizen 1985
 Fellow of Imperial College 1987
 Senior Fellow Royal College of Art 1987
 Fellow of London Business School 1988
 MBA of the year 1988
 University of Manitoba Distinguished International Entrepreneur 1989
 University of Westminster Doctor of Letters 1998
 Coventry Award of Merit.

References

Living people
1939 births
People from Rawtenstall
People from Coventry
People educated at Bablake School
People educated at Bacup and Rawtenstall Grammar School
Alumni of London Business School
Alumni of Imperial College London
People associated with Coventry University
Deputy Lieutenants of Warwickshire
Knights Bachelor